The following is a timeline of the history of the city of Villahermosa in Centro Municipality, Tabasco state, Mexico.

Prior to 20th century

 1596 - Settlement founded.
 1598 - Settlement named "Villahermosa".
 1677 - Regional seat of government relocated from Villahermosa to Tacotalpa.
 1797 - Regional seat of government relocated to Villahermosa from Tacotalpa.
 1824
 Villahermosa becomes capital of State of Tabasco.
 Congress of Tabasco headquartered in town.
 Printing press in operation.
 1826
 Town renamed "San Juan Bautista".
 Argos Tabasqueño newspaper begins publication.
 1846 - 24–26 October: First Battle of Tabasco against U.S. forces.
 1847
 15–16 June: Second Battle of Tabasco.
 Regional seat of government relocated from Villahermosa to Tacotalpa.
 1880 - Roman Catholic Diocese of Tabasco established.
 1881 - El Tabasqueño newspaper in publication.
 1890 - Casa de los azulejos (residence) built.
 1895 - Population: 9,604.
 1900 - Population: 10,548.

20th century

 1915 - City named "Villahermosa" again.
 1921 - Diario de Tabasco newspaper begins publication.
 1924 - Liga Central de Resistencia (political group) headquartered in city.
 1932 - 12 October: Flood.
 1958 -  (museum) opens.
 1974 - Villahermosa Institute of Technology established.
 1977 - Oil discovered near city (approximate date).
 1979 - Pérez International Airport inaugurated.
 1982
 1 January:  held.
 Casa de Artes (cultural institution) founded.
 1987
 Peñitas Dam commissioned near city on the Grijalva River.
  newspaper begins publication.
 1988
 9 October:  held.
  (museum) opens.
 1990
  (church) built.
 Population: 261,131 city; 386,776 Centro Municipality.
 1994 - 20 November:  held.
 1995 - Population: 301,328 city; 465,449 Centro Municipality.
 1999 - September: Flood.
 2000
 15 October:  held.
 Mormon temple built.
 Population: 430,846 city; 520,308 Centro Municipality.

21st century

 2005 - Population: 558,524 city; 664,629 Centro Municipality.
 2006 - 15 October: 2006 Tabasco state election held.
 2007 - October: 2007 Tabasco flood.
 2009 - Jesús Alí de la Torre elected mayor of Centro Municipality.
 2010 - Population: 353,577 city; 755,425 metro.
 2012 - 1 July: 2012 Tabasco gubernatorial election held.

See also
  (in Spanish)
 Categoría:Villahermosa (in Spanish)
  (state)
 List of governors of Tabasco state (Spanish version, 1519–present)

References

This article incorporates information from the Spanish Wikipedia.

Bibliography

External links

  (includes Villahermosa)

Villahermosa
Villahermosa
Villahermosa